Yung Pi-hock (born 4 November 1930) is a Taiwanese former basketball player. He competed as part of the Republic of China's squad at the 1956 Summer Olympics.

References

External links
 

1930 births
Possibly living people
Taiwanese men's basketball players
Olympic basketball players of Taiwan
Basketball players at the 1956 Summer Olympics
Basketball players at the 1954 Asian Games
Asian Games medalists in basketball
Asian Games silver medalists for Chinese Taipei
Medalists at the 1954 Asian Games
Republic of China men's national basketball team players